Volker von Collande (21 November 1913 – 29 October 1990) was a German actor and film director. He appeared in more than 40 films between 1934 and 1987. He also directed more than 20 films between 1942 and 1967.  Collande was a member of the Nazi Party.

Selected filmography

Actor

 Rivalen der Luft (1934) - Hanne aus Hamburg, Flugschüler
 Hermine and the Seven Upright Men (1935)
 The Student of Prague (1935) - Zavrel
 The Higher Command (1935) - Bürger
 Winter in the Woods (1936) - Hartwig, Glasbläster
 The Traitor (1936) - Referendar Kröpke
 Thunder, Lightning and Sunshine (1936) - Andreas, sein Sohn
 Togger (1937) - Redakteur Hallmann
 Capers (1937) - William Baxter
 Das Ehesanatorium (1938) - Stephan Seidlitz
 Eine Frau kommt in die Tropen (1938) - Herbert - sein Bruder
 Schwarzfahrt ins Glück (1938) - Automechaniker Hanne Schmidt
 Target in the Clouds (1939) - Ewald Menzel
 The Curtain Falls (1939) - Rapp
 A Woman Like You (1939) - Ingenieur Wallrodt
 Her First Experience (1939) - Jochen
 Polterabend (1940) - Thomas
 Kopf hoch, Johannes! (1941) - Zugführer Dr. Angermann
 Männerwirtschaft (1941) - Hinnerk - Bauer
 The Swedish Nightingale (1941) - Olaf Larsson
 Two in a Big City (1942) - Dr. Eberhard Berg
 Fritze Bollmann wollte angeln (1943) - Volker von Collande
 Wild Bird (1943) - Wolff
 Ein schöner Tag (1944) - Fritz Schröder
  (1944) - Oberleutnant Arnold Kersten
 Unknown Sender (1950) - Fredy Brown
 Dreizehn unter einem Hut (1950) - Wolfgang Huth
 Abundance of Life (1950) - Sarghändler
 Immortal Light (1951) - René Garnier
 Wildwest in Oberbayern (1951) - Hans - Gestütsverwalter
 I'm Waiting for You (1952) - Kinderarzt Dr. Born
 Rebellion (1954) - Carlos Maraga
 Captain Wronski (1954) - Major Kegel

Director
 Two in a Big City (1942)
 The Bath in the Barn (1943)
 I'm Waiting for You (1952)
  (1956)

Screenwriter
 How Do We Tell Our Children? (1949)

References

External links

1913 births
1990 deaths
Actors from Dresden
People from the Kingdom of Saxony
Nazi Party members
German male film actors
Mass media people from Saxony
20th-century German male actors